Dorcadion impressicolle is a species of beetle in the family Cerambycidae. It was described by Kraatz in 1873. It is known from Lebanon and Syria.

References

impressicolle
Beetles described in 1873